The Reading and Meteor were American steam cars developed by Irvin D. Lengel in 1901 in Reading, Pennsylvania.

Reading Steam Carriage
Built by the Steam Vehicle Company of America, their advertisement promised their Model B "runs indefinitely without attention." The steamer featured a four-cylinder steam engine when most steamers used two-cylinders.

It had a bench seat over the engine compartment with tiller type steering.  Drive was by chain to the rear wheels. The Model B sold for $850, . A year into the production of the Reading, creditors liquidated the company.

Meteor Steam Car 
Irvin D. Lengel was also a principal of Meteor Engineering Company who took over the assets of the Steam Vehicle Company of America in 1902.  Meteor built a tonneau version of the steam car.  Meteor also built a prototype gasoline automobile, but by the fall of 1903, Meteor Engineering Company was bankrupt.

References

Defunct motor vehicle manufacturers of the United States
Motor vehicle manufacturers based in Pennsylvania
Vehicle manufacturing companies established in 1901
Vehicle manufacturing companies disestablished in 1903
Steam cars
1900s cars
Veteran vehicles
Cars introduced in 1901